Hadım Hasan Pasha (died 1598 in Constantinople) was an Ottoman statesman. He was an Albanian Grand Vizier of the Ottoman Empire from 1597 to 1598. He was also the Ottoman governor of Egypt from 1580 to 1583.

See also
 List of Ottoman Grand Viziers
 List of Ottoman governors of Egypt

References

1598 deaths
16th-century Grand Viziers of the Ottoman Empire
16th-century Ottoman governors of Egypt
Albanian Grand Viziers of the Ottoman Empire
Devshirme
Ottoman governors of Egypt
Eunuchs from the Ottoman Empire
Year of birth unknown